Events from the year 1665 in Sweden

Incumbents
 Monarch – Charles XI

Events

Births

 4 March - Philip Christoph von Königsmarck, soldier (died 1694) 
 Ingeborg i Mjärhult, natural healer, medicine woman, herbalist, natural philosopher, soothsayer and spiritual visionary (died 1749) 
 Magnus Stenbock, officer (died 1717)
 Catharina Bröms, ironmaster  (died  1735)
 Jonas Lambert-Wenman, pirate (died 1732)

Deaths

References

 
Years of the 17th century in Sweden
Sweden